Adilabad railway station (station code: ADB) is located at Adilabad town of Adilabad district, in the Indian state of Telangana. It is under the administration of Nanded railway division of South Central Railway zone.

Services 
Adilabad is connected to many cities like Mumbai, Patna, Hyderabad, Tirupati, Kolkata, Varanasi, Allahabad, Gaya, Kolhapur, Latur, Pandharpur ,Nagpur, Nashik, Nanded and Aurangabad.

List of trains 

Famous train Nandigram Express originates from Adilabad and runs till Mumbai CSMT.

References 

Nanded railway division
Railway stations in Adilabad district